The Birds is a 1963 American natural horror-thriller film produced and directed by Alfred Hitchcock. Loosely based on the 1952 short story of the same name by Daphne du Maurier, it focuses on a series of sudden and unexplained violent bird attacks on the people of Bodega Bay, California, over the course of a few days.

The film stars Rod Taylor and Tippi Hedren in her screen debut, alongside Jessica Tandy, Suzanne Pleshette, and Veronica Cartwright. The screenplay is by Evan Hunter, who was told by Hitchcock to develop new characters and a more elaborate plot while keeping du Maurier's title and concept of unexplained bird attacks.

At the 36th Academy Awards, Ub Iwerks was nominated for Best Special Effects for his work on the film.  The award, however, went to the only other nominee,  Emil Kosa Jr. for Cleopatra.

In 2016, The Birds was deemed "culturally, historically, or aesthetically significant" by the United States Library of Congress, and selected for preservation in its National Film Registry.

Plot 
At a San Francisco pet store, socialite Melanie Daniels meets lawyer Mitch Brenner who is looking to buy lovebirds for his sister Cathy's 11th birthday. Recognizing Melanie from her court appearance regarding a practical joke gone awry, Mitch pretends to mistake her for a shop employee. Mitch tests Melanie's knowledge of birds, which she fails. He discloses his prior knowledge of her and that his ruse was intended to make her appreciate being on the other end of a joke. Mitch leaves without buying anything. Finding him attractive, Melanie buys the lovebirds to make amends and drives to Bodega Bay after she learns Mitch has gone to his family's farm for the weekend. Melanie is directed to the local teacher at Bodega named Annie Hayworth, to learn Cathy's name. Annie previously dated Mitch but ended it due to Mitch's cold, overbearing mother, Lydia, who dislikes any woman in Mitch's life.

Melanie rents a boat in town and crosses the bay to leave the lovebirds at the Brenner farm discreetly. Mitch spots Melanie during her retreat and drives into town to meet her at the dock. As Melanie approaches the wharf, a gull attacks her. Mitch tends to her head wound inside a diner. Lydia arrives, meets Melanie, and Mitch announces to Lydia that he is inviting Melanie to dinner. Melanie returns to Annie's house and asks to spend the night. At the farm, Lydia's hens are suddenly refusing to eat. Lydia expresses her disapproval of Melanie to Mitch due to her exaggerated reputation, as reported in gossip columns. Mitch calls Melanie and invites her to Cathy's birthday party being held the next day. Shortly after, there is a violent thud at Annie's front door. A dead gull is found at the threshold.

At Cathy's party, Melanie privately tells Mitch about her troubled past and her mother running off with another man when Melanie was Cathy's age. During a game, the children are attacked and some injured by gulls. Later that evening, as Melanie dines with the Brenners, sparrows swarm the house through the chimney. Later, Mitch insists she delay driving back to San Francisco and stay the night. The next morning, Lydia visits her neighbor to discuss why their chickens will not eat. She discovers his eyeless corpse, pecked lifeless by birds, and flees in horror. As Lydia recovers at home, she fears for Cathy's safety, and Melanie offers to pick her up at school. As Melanie waits outside the schoolhouse, a large flock of crows slowly engulfs the jungle gym behind her. Anticipating an attack, she warns Annie. As they evacuate the children, the crows attack, injuring several children. Mitch finds Melanie at the diner. When gulls attack a gas station attendant, Mitch and several other men assist him outside. Spilled gasoline ignites everywhere, causing an explosion. During the escalating fire, Melanie and others rush out but more gulls attack, and Melanie takes refuge in a telephone booth. Mitch saves her, and they get back inside the diner. A distraught woman blames Melanie for the attacks, claiming they began with her arrival.

Mitch and Melanie go to Annie's house to fetch Cathy. They find Annie's body outside, killed by the crows while protecting Cathy. They pick up Cathy and take her home. That night, Melanie and the Brenners barricade themselves in the family home, which is attacked by waves of birds that nearly breach the boarded-up doors and windows. During a lull, Melanie investigates a fluttering sound in the attic bedroom. After discovering that the birds have pecked their way in through the roof, Melanie is violently attacked, trapping her until Mitch pulls her out. Melanie is badly injured and traumatized; Mitch insists they all drive to San Francisco to take Melanie to a hospital. As Mitch readies Melanie's car for their escape, a menacing sea of birds has quietly gathered around the Brenner house. Mitch quietly moves the car out. The car radio reports bird attacks on nearby communities such as Santa Rosa, and the military may intervene. Cathy retrieves her lovebirds (the only birds who do not attack) from the house and joins Mitch and Lydia as they carefully escort Melanie past a mass of birds and into the car. The car slowly drives away as thousands of birds watch ominously.

Cast 

Alfred Hitchcock makes his signature cameo as a man walking dogs out of the pet shop at the beginning of the film. They were two of his own Sealyham Terriers, Geoffrey and Stanley.

Real-life event inspiration
The Birds film was partly inspired by the true events of a mass bird attack on the seaside town of Capitola in California on August 18, 1961, when "Capitola residents awoke to a scene that seemed straight out of a horror movie. Hordes of seabirds were dive-bombing their homes, crashing into cars and spewing half-digested anchovies onto lawns". Alfred Hitchcock heard of this event and used it as research material for this film which was then in progress. The real cause of the birds' behavior was toxic algae, but that was not known back in the 1960s.

Production

Development 
The screenplay for the film is based on Daphne du Maurier's novella "The Birds", which was first published in her 1952 short story collection The Apple Tree. The protagonist of the novella is a farm hand living in Cornwall, and the conclusion of the story is far more pessimistic than that of the film. It was adapted by Evan Hunter, who had written previously for Alfred Hitchcock's Mystery Magazine, and the television anthology series Alfred Hitchcock Presents. The relationship between Hunter and Hitchcock during the creation of The Birds was documented by the writer in his 1997 autobiography, Me and Hitch, which contains a variety of correspondence between the writer, director and Hitchcock's assistant, Peggy Robertson.

Hunter began working on the screenplay in September 1961. He and Hitchcock developed the story, suggesting foundations such as the townspeople having a guilty secret to hide, and the birds an instrument of punishment. He suggested that the film begin using some elements borrowed from the screwball comedy genre, then have it evolve into "stark terror". This appealed to Hitchcock, according to the writer, because it conformed to his love of suspense: the title and the publicity would have already informed the audience that birds attack, but they do not know when. The initial humor followed by horror would turn the suspense into shock. At first, Hunter wanted the protagonist to be a school teacher, but this ended up being the basis for Annie Hayworth's character instead. Hunter organised his scripts by shots instead of scenes, although this did not affect the final film.

Hitchcock solicited comments from several people regarding the first draft of Hunter's screenplay. Consolidating their criticisms, Hitchcock wrote to Hunter, suggesting that the script (particularly the first part) was too long, contained insufficient characterization in the two leads, and that some scenes lacked drama and audience interest. Hitchcock, at later stages, consulted with his friends, Hume Cronyn (whose wife Jessica Tandy was playing Lydia), and V. S. Pritchett, who both offered lengthy reflections on the work. This is something that Hunter found difficult. Hitchcock cut the last 10 pages of the screenplay, although some sources say possibly more, in order to create a more ambiguous ending. Originally, he wanted the film to end without a "The End" card, but he was forced to include one before the film's full release.

Birds used in the film 
The majority of the birds seen in the film are real, although it is estimated that more than $200,000 was spent on the creation of mechanical birds for the film. Ray Berwick was in charge of the live birds used in the production, training and catching many of them himself. Some of the "crows" were actually ravens. The gulls were caught in the San Francisco garbage dump and the sparrows were caught by John "Bud" Cardos. However, the captured sparrows had to be used alongside birds from pet shops to achieve full effect in the scene where they invade the house.

Soundtrack 

Hitchcock decided to do without any conventional incidental score. Instead, he made use of sound effects and sparse source music in counterpoint to calculated silences. He wanted to use the electroacoustic Mixtur-Trautonium to create the bird calls and noises. He had first encountered this predecessor to the synthesizer on Berlin radio in the late 1920s. It was invented by Friedrich Trautwein, and further developed by Oskar Sala into the Trautonium, which would create some of the bird sounds for this film.

The director commissioned Sala and Remi Gassmann to design an electronic soundtrack. They are credited with "electronic sound production and composition", and Hitchcock's previous musical collaborator, Bernard Herrmann, is credited as "sound consultant".

Source music includes the first of Claude Debussy's Deux arabesques, which Tippi Hedren's character plays on piano, and "Nickety Nackety Now Now Now" by folk musician Chubby Parker, which is sung by the schoolchildren.

Special effects 
Once the crow attack and attic scenes were assembled by the film's editor, George Tomasini, they were sent to the special effects department for enhancement. The film required myriad special effects and Hitchcock commissioned the help of various studios. The special effects shots of the attacking birds were completed at Walt Disney Studios by animator/technician Ub Iwerks, who used the sodium vapor process ("yellow screen"), which he had helped to develop. The SV process films the subject against a screen lit with narrow-spectrum sodium vapor lights. Unlike most compositing processes, SVP shoots two separate elements of the footage simultaneously using a beam-splitter. One reel is regular film stock and the other a film stock with emulsion sensitive only to the sodium vapor wavelength. This results in very precise matte shots compared to blue screen special effects, necessary due to "fringing" of the image from the birds' rapid wing flapping. At Disney, Iwerks worked on the following scenes: the children's party, Melanie driving to Bodega Bay, and the first two cuts of the crow attack sequence. One of the biggest challenges facing Iwerks was the scene where a number of sparrows fly in through the chimney of the family home. Utilizing an optical printer, his superposition of a group of small birds flying inside an enclosed glass booth made it possible to multiply the birds in the living room. Most of the special effects work done at Disney was completed in the Process Lab on printer 10, which was made from Iwerks' own original design.

At MGM, Bob Hoag was put in charge of the optical effects for the sequence where Melanie hides inside a telephone booth as it is attacked by the birds. Hitchcock had requested that Hoag remove any shot where Melanie looked placid and urged that she be in constant movement instead. Hoag, along with a team of 30, worked together on the blue backing and sodium matte shots. Linwood Dunn, a founder of Film Effects of Hollywood, was commissioned to work on the attic scene. He was asked to produce a rough cut of the sequence before Hitchcock left for Berlin in December 1962. Bill Abbott, at Fox, was in charge of the optical effects for the crow attack sequence, which would take six weeks to finish. Abbott organised two teams—both working 11 hours a day—to work on the sequence simultaneously. Abbott's biggest challenge was size ratio, as he had to ensure that the birds looked like they were attacking the children. He achieved this by placing the birds within frame and zooming in on them to make them the correct size in proportion to the children. At Universal-International Pictures, associate editor Ross Hoffman and matte artist Albert Whitlock both worked on designing the town's backdrop, including the birds in the trees and the scenery for the river shots of Melanie's car arriving in Bodega Bay. The Birds featured 370 effects shots, the final shot being a composite of 32 separate elements.

Themes and style

Themes 
Among the central themes explored in The Birds are those of love and violence. The representation of the birds in the film constantly changes to reflect the development of these themes, and the story itself. At first, the lovebirds in the pet store signify the blossoming love between Melanie and Mitch, and the sexual tension between the two. However, the birds' symbolism changes once they begin to attack Bodega Bay. Hitchcock stated in an interview that the birds in the film rise up against the humans to punish them for taking nature for granted.

Another theme explored within the film is the entrapment of civilians. This is because the birds attack anyone who goes outside, consequently leaving people trapped inside their homes.

Humanities scholar Camille Paglia wrote a monograph about the film for the BFI Film Classics series. She interprets it as an ode to the many facets of female sexuality and, by extension, nature itself. She notes that women play pivotal roles in it. Mitch is defined by his relationships with his mother, sister, and ex-lover—a careful balance that is disrupted by his attraction to the beautiful Melanie.

Style 
Montage editing and slow pacing are used within the film to build suspense and elicit a greater emotional response from the audience during the attack scenes: "The pattern of The Birds was deliberately to go slow". This is exemplified in the scene where the birds gradually gather outside of the school, while an unobservant Melanie sits and waits on the bench. The camera then cuts between her and the increasing number of birds that swoop down onto the jungle gym behind her until they finally attack.

Eyeline matches and point-of-view (POV) shots within the film encourage audience identification with particular characters and their subjective experiences. This is achieved by cutting between the character and the object of their gaze. For example, when Melanie crosses the bay near the beginning of the film, the camera cuts between close-ups of her face and shots of the Brenner house from her perspective, as she watches Mitch fall for her prank.

The focus on editing and visuals rather than dialogue is also an element of pure cinema that Hitchcock largely uses throughout his work.

Release and accolades 
The film premiered March 28, 1963, in New York City. The Museum of Modern Art hosted an invitation-only screening as part of a 50-film retrospective of Hitchcock's film work. The MoMA series had a booklet with a monograph on the director written by Peter Bogdanovich. The film was screened out of competition in May at a prestigious invitational showing at the 1963 Cannes Film Festival with Hitchcock and Hedren in attendance.

As a special favor to Hedren, Hitchcock allowed her to take a copy of the film with her when she visited her hometown of Minneapolis after the film premiered in New York City. On April 1, Hedren hosted her parents and about 130 residents of Lafayette, Minnesota, where her parents lived when she was born, to an exclusive screening of the film at the local neighborhood theater Hedren frequented in her youth, The Westgate, in Morningside, Minnesota, a suburb of Minneapolis, where Hedren grew up. The theater was demolished in 2019.

Ub Iwerks was nominated for an Academy Award for Best Special Effects. The winner that year was Cleopatra. Tippi Hedren received the Golden Globe Award for New Star of the Year – Actress in 1964, sharing it with Ursula Andress and Elke Sommer. She also received the Photoplay Award as Most Promising Newcomer. The film ranked No. 1 of the top 10 foreign films selected by the Bengal Film Journalists' Association Awards. Hitchcock also received the Association's Director Award for the film.

It also won the Horror Hall of Fame Award in 1991.

Reception 
The Birds received mixed reviews upon its initial release. Bosley Crowther of The New York Times was positive, calling it "a horror film that should raise the hackles on the most courageous and put goose-pimples on the toughest hide". Crowther was unsure whether the birds were meant to be an allegory because "it isn't in Mr. Hitchcock's style to inject allegorical meanings or social significance in his films", but he suggested that they could represent the Furies of Greek mythology who pursued the wicked upon the earth.

Stanley Kauffmann of The New Republic called The Birds "the worst thriller of his [Hitchcock's] that I can remember".

Richard L. Coe of The Washington Post called it "gorgeous good fun" in the vein of Hitchcock's earlier black comedy The Trouble with Harry, adding: "I haven't had this kind of merriment since King Kong toppled from the Empire State Building". The Monthly Film Bulletin wrote: "For all the brilliance of scenes like the attack down the chimney, one rarely has a chance to suspend disbelief", but the review still thought that "there is still a great deal more to enjoy than carp at". The film ranked second on Cahiers du Cinéma's Top 10 Films of the Year List in 1963. Andrew Sarris of The Village Voice praised the film, writing: "Drawing from the relatively invisible literary talents of Daphne DuMaurier and Evan Hunter, Alfred Hitchcock has fashioned a major work of cinematic art".

Philip K. Scheuer of the Los Angeles Times was among the critics who panned the film, writing that Hitchcock "was once widely quoted as saying he hated actors. After his 1960 'Psycho' and now The Birds, it must be fairly obvious that he has extended his abhorrence to the whole human race. For reasons hardly justified either dramatically or aesthetically, the old master has become a master of the perverse. He has gone all out for shock for shock's sake, and it is too bad". Variety published a mixed assessment, writing that while the film was "slickly executed and fortified with his characteristic tongue-in-cheek touches", Hitchcock "deals more provocatively and effectively in human menace. A fantasy framework dilutes the toxic content of his patented terror-tension formula, and gives the picture a kind of sci-fi exploitation feel, albeit with a touch of production gloss". Brendan Gill of The New Yorker called the film "a sorry failure. Hard as it may be to believe of Hitchcock, it doesn't arouse suspense, which is, of course, what justifies and transforms the sadism that lies at the heart of every thriller. Here the sadism is all too nakedly, repellently present".

It is the only Hitchcock movie to have been featured in Mad magazine (as "For the Birds", issue 82, October 1963, by Mort Drucker, Arnie Kogen, and Lou Silverstone). In the Mad spoof, it is "revealed" that the birds are controlled by Burt Lancaster as revenge for his not having won an Academy Award that year for his starring role in Birdman of Alcatraz.

The film's first television broadcast was in Canada on CTV television on December 30, 1967. Its subsequent U.S. appearance was on NBC television on January 6, 1968, and became the most watched film on television surpassing The Bridge on the River Kwai with a Nielsen rating of 38.9 and an audience share of 59%. The record was beaten in 1972 by Love Story.

With the passage of time, much like many other of Hitchcock's works, the film's standing among critics has much improved. The film has been very influential on the horror genre inspiring filmmakers like Guillermo del Toro and John Carpenter. On Rotten Tomatoes it has a "Certified Fresh" 93% rating based on reviews from 59 critics, with an average rating of 8.20/10, and the website's consensus states: "Proving once again that build-up is the key to suspense, Hitchcock successfully turned birds into some of the most terrifying villains in horror history". On Metacritic it has a score of 90 out of 100, based on reviews from 15 critics, indicating "universal acclaim". Film critic David Thomson refers to it as Hitchcock's "last unflawed film". Italian film maker Federico Fellini ranked the film among his top ten favourite films of all-time list. Akira Kurosawa ranked the film at No. 55 on his Top 100 favourite films of all time list. In 2000, The Guardian ranked the scene where the crows gather on the climbing frame at No. 16 on their list of "The top 100 film moments". The scenes where birds are attacking humans viciously were collectively ranked at No. 96 on Bravo's The 100 Scariest Movie Moments. In 2021, the film was ranked at No. 29 by Time Out on their list of "The 100 best horror movies".

The film was honored by the American Film Institute as the seventh greatest thriller in American Cinema.

Controversy 
There was controversy in relation to the nature of Alfred Hitchcock and Tippi Hedren's relationship during the filming of The Birds. Hedren maintained that there were several incidents where Hitchcock acted inappropriately towards her. The cast and crew described his behaviour as "obsessive", and Hedren claimed that "he suddenly grabbed me and put his hands on me. It was sexual". Hedren stated that she rejected Hitchcock's advances on numerous occasions. Following the alleged rejection, Hedren was injured during the filming of the phone booth attack scene, and consequently suffered cuts to her face from a pane of glass shattering on her. Further, she insisted she was misled about the logistics of the final attack sequence, where mechanical birds were replaced with real ones at the last minute.

It has been suggested that "Hitchcock's deliberate inflicting of injury was revenge for Hedren's spurning of his advances". Hitchcock also signed Hedren to a seven-year contract, which she stated restricted her ability to work. These allegations were not brought to light until after Hitchcock's death. Although they have never been confirmed, they have widely been reported, including by Hedren's co-star, Rod Taylor.

Hedren would later claim during a 2016 interview with Larry King that "[the sexual advances] didn't happen until we were almost finished with Marnie", that they had not started during The Birds, and that up until the end of Marnie Hitchcock had been "easy to work with", but in her memoir released around the same time, she repeated the earlier allegations, though clarified that the sexual assaults didn't begin until Marnie.

The controversy of this relationship is explored in the 2012 HBO/BBC film The Girl. Hedren's daughter Melanie Griffith claims that Hitchcock's abuse extended to her when he played a "prank" by gifting six-year-old Melanie with a wax figure of her mother in a miniature coffin.

Supposedly, Daphne du Maurier disliked the film, as Hitchcock had changed the location from a farm in England to a sleepy beach community in Northern California.

Sequel 
A poorly received television sequel, The Birds II: Land's End, was released in 1994. Director Rick Rosenthal removed his name from credit and used the Hollywood pseudonym Alan Smithee. The sequel featured entirely new characters and a different setting, with Bodega Bay only mentioned once. Tippi Hedren returned in a supporting role, but not as her original character.

See also 

 List of American films of 1963
 Bodega Bay Nuclear Power Plant

References

Bibliography 

 
 
 
 
 
 
 
 
 
 .
 
 
 
 
 Raubicheck, Walter; Srebnick, Walter, eds. (1991). Hitchcock's Rereleased Films: From Rope to Vertigo. Detroit: Wayne State University Press. .

External links 

 
 
 
 
 
 
 Monograph on The Birds at Senses of Cinema
 Analytical summary by Tim Dirks at AMC Filmsite
 Film script

Streaming audio
 The Birds on Lux Radio Theater: July 20, 1953
 The Birds on Escape: July 10, 1954

1963 films
1963 horror films
1960s American films
1960s English-language films
1960s horror thriller films
American horror thriller films
American natural horror films
Bodega Bay
Films based on horror novels
Films based on short fiction
Films based on works by Daphne du Maurier
Films directed by Alfred Hitchcock
Films produced by Alfred Hitchcock
Films set in San Francisco
Films set in the San Francisco Bay Area
Films shot in California
Films with screenplays by Evan Hunter
Horror films about birds
United States National Film Registry films
Universal Pictures films
Films without soundtracks